Pastoral farming (also known in some regions as ranching, livestock farming or grazing) is aimed at producing livestock, rather than growing crops. Examples include dairy farming, raising beef cattle, and raising sheep for wool. In contrast, arable farming concentrates on crops rather than livestock. Finally, mixed farming incorporates livestock and crops on a single farm. Some mixed farmers grow crops purely as fodder for their livestock; some crop farmers grow fodder and sell it. In some cases (such as in Australia) pastoral farmers are known as graziers, and in some cases pastoralists (in a use of the term different from traditional nomadic livestock cultures). Pastoral farming is a non-nomadic form of pastoralism in which the livestock farmer has some form of ownership of the land used, giving the farmer more economic incentive to improve the land. Unlike other pastoral systems, pastoral farmers are sedentary and do not change locations in search of fresh resources. Rather, pastoral farmers adjust their pastures to fit the needs of their animals. Improvements include drainage (in wet regions), stock tanks (in dry regions), irrigation and sowing clover.

Pastoral farming is common in Argentina, Australia, Brazil, Great Britain, Ireland, New Zealand, and the Western United States and Canada, among other places.

Characteristics

There are many factors that are taken into account to decide what type of farming should take place on a certain area of land including, topography, altitude, exposure, and rainfall. Soil plays a large role in determining how land will be used. Mollisol lands are typically described as semi-arid to semi-humid areas that are grassy and wet. This is where most intensive cattle operations occur which produce beef and dairy. Although a majority of pastoral farming is conducted in Mollisol lands, pastoral farming can also be found in areas with soil made up of Entisol, Aridisol or Alfisol. Aside from soil order, pastoral farming is more likely to be found than arable farming in areas with steep slopes, cold strong winds and a wet climate. All of these conditions are more advantageous to raising livestock than crops. Raising of sheep is often found in cooler regions with steep hills and above-average rainfall. The wetness of the area and incline would make it unsuitable to grow crops. A similar conclusion is drawn by looking at dairy farms which are often found in warm wet climates.

Locations

Argentina
The first settlers of Argentina arrived approximately twelve thousand years ago and survived by hunting and gathering. During the 16th century, the Incan Empire dominated the area. The Incas were highly advanced for their time and were able to domesticate llamas and alpacas. In 1532, the Spaniards arrived and found open grasslands perfect for their cattle and horses to graze. Quickly, these herds grew and changed the environment making it more nutritious and fertile. The large cattle population was then hunted and used for economic prosperity. This marked the beginning of pastoral farming in Argentina as land began to be used for raising cattle. These farms became known as "estancias", Spanish for "a stay". The estancias were spread around 200 square kilometres could support about 20,000 cattle. and at the 19th century, sheep were added to the estancias. The Pampas saw a shocking growth in livestock population. The main animal products of the time became hides, fat, wool and salted meat.

Today, Argentina's livestock production is divided into two sectors- a modernized commercial part and a communal part. Pastoralism is still a prominent figure in the communal sector of Argentina's livestock production. Communal agriculture face disadvantages compared to their commercial counterparts as they have limited access to new technology and external inputs. In 2001, the country's stock included approximately 48 million cattle, 13.5 million sheep and 1.5 million horses. The number of sheep was reduced greatly recently because of a dramatic decrease in the price of wool. As of 2001, the majority of beef, lamb, and milk production in Argentina was domestically consumed.

South Australia
Pastoral farming arrived in South Australia in 1836 with the importation of sheep and cattle from New South Wales. Australia faces a tough climate with approximately 70% of its landmass being classified as arid or semi-arid. This made South Australia a perfect candidate for grazing since its climate was not suitable for arable farming such as wheat production. In the 1840s South Australian farmers began to focus on wool production and prospered. Unfortunately in the 1860s, South Australia faced serious droughts. To prevent future instances from occurring, the agricultural industry underwent serious specialization measures and focused on improving the pastures of pastoral farmers. The system they developed included low-density grazing of sheep and cattle. In addition, water was pumped from underground sources by wind power. These improvements helped to better satisfy the livestock's needs.

Ireland
Bronze Age people first introduced pastoral farming to Ireland. The Burren area was popular for settlers because of its dry and fertile soils. The first pastoral farmers were known for herding cattle, sheep and goats. Pastoral farming could also be found in the uplands such as Turlough Hill. Dating back to mediaeval times, farmers used the hill as a tool during the winter months. Cattle grazed there because the foliage was always available because the rock retained heat. Also, the lime-rich soil would provide animals with calcium and other minerals to help increase their fat levels. In the early 19th century, sheep herding was most popular in the Burren.

By the 20th century, however, there was a shift in importance from sheep to cattle. Trends in livestock units show that goats were just under 4% of cattle livestock units in the 1930s but had decreased to just over 0.5% by 1980. Today in Ireland, farm sizes have increased, the number of full-time farmers have decreased and heavier continental breeds have become more popular in comparison to the past.

New Zealand
New Zealand's pastoral sector is made up of cattle, deer and sheep. In the 1920s, meat, butter, cheese and wool, accounted for over 90% of the country's exports. The trend of high pastoral farming has continued to the present day. The modernization of arable farming and horticulture have been met with equal advances in pastoral farming.

While sheep and beef farming use most of the land in New Zealand, the dairy industry is increasing in importance. The dairy sector began in 1814 when two cows and a bull were imported to New Zealand and the industry has been strong ever since. The New Zealand Institute of Economic Research (published Dec 2010) estimates the industry contributes around 2.8% to New Zealand's GDP and 10.4 billion of export earnings. Dairy production has risen 77 per cent over the past 20 years - from three million dairy cattle in 1989 to six million dairy cattle in 2009.

Categories

Intensive farming
Intensive farms generally take up a fairly small area of land, but aim to have a very high output, through massive inputs of capital and labour. These farms use machines and new technologies to become as efficient and cost-effective as possible, an example being the Concentrated Animal Feeding Operation.

Intensive agriculture can be seen in many places around the world, such as the Canterbury Plains of New Zealand, pig farming in Denmark and rice cultivation in the countries of South East Asia. All use technology appropriate to their country to enable them to get the highest yields from their land. It is labour-intensive, capital intensive and machine intensive.

Extensive farming

Extensive farming is the direct opposite of intensive farming. The farms are large in comparison to the money injected into them or the labour used. The cattle stations of central Australia are a good example of extensive agriculture, where often only a few farm workers are responsible for thousands of acres of farmland.

Another example of extensive farming can be seen in the massive cattle ranches of Brazil. These involve clearing vast areas of rainforest (the trees are often burnt rather than chopped down and sold) to make way for the cattle ranch. The cattle quickly eat the remaining vegetation and begin to cause massive problems of soil erosion. Extensive farming is also the production of livestock and crops on large piece of land having small output in return. Less attention is given here as compared to intensive farming.

Constraints
Livestock farming faces many potential problems and constraints. First, there are often exportation problems. With a high volume of trade there is also a high risk of spreading diseases from country to country. Britain saw the damage communicable animal diseases could cause in the 1980s and 1990s with the outbreak of mad cow disease. In this instance, the disease was able to infect humans as well. In pastoral farming the health of the animals is a high priority. 

For low-income developing countries, heavily investing in pastoral farming is risky because expected returns can decrease significantly due to unforeseeable events such as climate change or natural disasters. If the country did experience an unfortunate event, there would be no other major industry to stabilize the economy or other goods to use as alternatives.
This is exemplified by the drought that Australia experienced in the 1860s which severely limited livestock forage.

Environmental degradation is another concern for livestock farmers. Environmental degradation often occurs when the resources are over-used. One major aspect of this degradation is the depletion of fresh water. Fresh water is needed by livestock to keep the animals in good health. Also, lack of water can reduce the soil moisture necessary for forage production.

See also

Holistic management
Pastoral farming in the United Kingdom
Rangeland management

References

Further reading
 

Agriculture by type